Jurassic Park is a 1990 science fiction action novel written by Michael Crichton. A cautionary tale about genetic engineering, it presents the collapse of an amusement park showcasing genetically recreated dinosaurs to illustrate the mathematical concept of chaos theory and its real world implications. A sequel titled The Lost World, also written by Crichton, was published in 1995. In 1997, both novels were republished as a single book titled Michael Crichton's Jurassic World.

Jurassic Park received a 1993 film adaptation of the same name directed by Steven Spielberg. The film was a critical and commercial success, becoming the highest-grossing film ever at the time and spawning five sequels.

Plot summary
In 1989, a series of strange animal attacks occurred throughout Costa Rica, including one that left a worker severely injured on a mysterious construction project on the nearby island of Isla Nublar. One of the species behind the attacks is identified as a Procompsognathus. Paleontologist Alan Grant and his paleobotanist graduate student Ellie Sattler are contacted to confirm the identification, but are abruptly whisked away by billionaire John Hammond—founder and chief executive officer of International Genetic Technologies, or InGen—for a weekend visit to a "biological preserve" he has established on Isla Nublar.

The preserve is revealed to be Jurassic Park, a theme park showcasing cloned dinosaurs. The animals have been recreated using fragments of dinosaur DNA found in the blood inside gnats, ticks, and mosquitoes that have been fossilized and preserved in amber. Gaps in the genetic code have been filled in with "compatible" reptilian, avian, or amphibian DNA. To control the population, all specimens on the island are lysine deficient and X-Ray sterilized females.

Recent incidents in the park have spooked Hammond's investors. To placate them, Hammond uses Grant and Sattler as fresh consultants. They stand in counterbalance to a famous mathematician and chaos theorist, Ian Malcolm, and a lawyer representing the investors, Donald Gennaro, who are pessimistic about the park's prospects. Malcolm, having been consulted before the park's creation, is especially emphatic in his prediction that the park will collapse, as it is an unsustainable, simple structure bluntly forced upon a complex system with too many unpredictable variables. Hammond also brings along his grandchildren, Tim and Alexis 'Lex' Murphy, who join the tour group. The park's staff includes engineer John Arnold, biotechnologist Henry Wu, game warden Robert Muldoon, public relations manager Ed Regis, and veterinarian Gerry Harding. While touring the park, Grant finds a Velociraptor eggshell, seemingly proving Malcolm's earlier assertion that the dinosaurs have somehow been breeding against the geneticists' design.

Meanwhile, the disgruntled chief programmer of Jurassic Park's controlling software, Dennis Nedry, attempts corporate espionage for Lewis Dodgson, a geneticist and agent of InGen's archrival, Biosyn. By activating a backdoor he wrote into the park's computer system, Nedry shuts down its security systems and steals frozen fertilized embryos for each of the park's fifteen species in an attempt to smuggle them out of the park. However, during Nedry's escape he gets lost due to a sudden tropical storm, and is killed by a Dilophosaurus. Without Nedry to reactivate the park's security, the electrified fences remain off and all the dinosaurs escape. The park's adult Tyrannosaurus attacks the guests on tour, with a juvenile T. rex killing Regis. In the aftermath, Grant and the children become lost in the park. Malcolm is gravely injured during the incident, but is found by Gennaro and Muldoon, and spends the remainder of the novel slowly dying as—between lucid lectures and morphine-induced rants—he tries to help the others understand their predicament and survive.

The park's staff manages to temporarily get the park largely back in order, restoring the computer system by shutting down and restarting the power. When trying to restore the park to working order, they fail to notice that the system has been running on auxiliary power since the restart. This power soon runs out, shutting the park down a second time. The park's intelligent and aggressive Velociraptors escape their enclosure and kill Arnold along with Wu. Meanwhile, Grant and the children slowly make their way back to the Visitor Center by rafting down the jungle river, carrying news that several young raptors were on board the island's supply ship when it departed for the mainland. After the three return to the visitor's center, they are contacted by the others, who instruct Grant to switch on the park's generators. Tim is then able to reactivate the park's main power, allowing Gennaro to force the supply ship to return.

Grant, Sattler, Muldoon, and Gennaro find the wild raptor nests and compare hatched eggs with the island's revised population tally, realizing the animals are leaving the island in an attempt at migration. Meanwhile, Hammond, taking a walk and contemplating building a new park that will improve on his previous mistakes, hears a T. rex roar and, startled, falls down a hill, where he is eaten by a pack of Procompsognathus. Grant deduces that using frog DNA to fill gaps in the dinosaurs' genetic code enabled a measure of dichogamy, in which some of the female animals changed into males in response to the same sex environment. The computer tally failed to include newborn animals, having been programmed to stop counting once the assumed correct total number of animals had been found.

The survivors are rescued by the Costa Rican Air Force, which declare the island hazardous and unsafe, and proceed to raze the island with napalm. Survivors of the incident are indefinitely detained by the United States and Costa Rican governments at a hotel. Weeks later, Grant is visited by Dr. Martin Guitierrez, an American doctor who lives in Costa Rica. Guitierrez informs Grant that an unknown pack of animals has been migrating through the Costa Rican jungle, eating lysine rich crops and chickens, indicating the dinosaurs may still exist in the wild.

Development 
The novel began as a screenplay Crichton wrote in 1983, about a graduate student who recreates a pterosaur. Eventually, given his reasoning that genetic research is expensive and "there is no pressing need to create a dinosaur", Crichton concluded that it would emerge from a "desire to entertain", leading to a wildlife park of extinct animals. Originally, the story was told from the point of view of a child, but Crichton changed it as everyone who read the draft felt it would be better if told by an adult.

Prehistoric animals featured
The following specified prehistoric animals are featured in the novel:
 Apatosaurus – Referred to as Brontosaurus by some characters. Replaced by Camarasaurus in some editions. Population 17.
 Cearadactylus – Referred to as Pterodactylus by some characters. Population 6.
 Dilophosaurus – Population 7.
 Dryosaurus – Usually referred to as Hypsilophodont. Population 34.
 Euoplocephalus – Population 16.
 Hadrosaurus – Population 11.
 Maiasaura – Population 22.
 Microceratus – Referred to as invalid junior synonym Microceratops. Replaced by Callovosaurus in some editions. Population 22.
 Nanosaurus – Referred to as invalid junior synonym Othnielia. Population 23.
 Procompsognathus – Population 65.
 Stegosaurus – Population 4.
 Styracosaurus – Population 18.
 Triceratops – Population 8.
 Tyrannosaurus – Population 2.
 Velociraptor – Population 37.

Animals in which their origin, genus and population are unspecified are the following:
 Giant dragonflies
 Unhatched herbivorous Coelurosauria - Referred to as informal generic name Coelurosaurus.
 Opossum
 Small rodents - Simply referred to as mice or rats.
 Birds
 Snakes
 Leeches
 Cicadas

Themes
 
Jurassic Park critiques the dystopian potentialities of science. Malcolm is the conscience that reminds John Hammond of the immoral and unnatural path that has been taken. The final condition of the park is epitomized by the word "hell", which highlights the nature of Hammond's sacrilegious attempt.

Michael Crichton's novel is another version of Mary Shelley's 1818 novel Frankenstein; or, The Modern Prometheus tale where humanity creates without knowing. Henry Wu is unable to name the things that he creates, which alludes to Victor Frankenstein not knowing what to call his flawed imitation of God's creative powers. The immorality of these actions lead to human destruction, echoing Frankenstein.

As Dale Speirs notes at p. 18 of "Vanished Worlds: Part 6" in Opuntia 483 (Sept. 2020), Jurassic Park resembles Katharine Metcalf Roof's November 1930 Weird Tales story "A Million Years After", about dinosaurs hatching from millions-of-years-old eggs. 

Similar to how his other novels represent science and technology as both hazardous and life-changing, Michael Crichton's novel highlights the hypocrisy and superiority complex of the scientific community that inspired John Hammond to re-create dinosaurs and treat them as commodities, which only lead to catastrophe. The similar fears of atomic power from the Cold War are adapted by Michael Crichton onto the anxieties evoked by genetic manipulation.

Reception 
The book became a bestseller and Michael Crichton's signature novel. It also received largely favorable reviews by critics. In a review for The New York Times, Christopher Lehmann-Haupt described it as "a superior specimen of the [Frankenstein] myth" and "easily the best of Mr. Crichton's novels to date". Writing for Entertainment Weekly, Gene Lyons held that the book was "hard to beat for sheer intellectual entertainment" largely because it was "[f]illed with diverting, up-to-date information in easily digestible form". Both Lyons' Entertainment Weekly piece and Andrew Ferguson's review in the Los Angeles Times, however, criticized Crichton's characterization as heavy-handed and his characters as clichéd. Ferguson further complained about Ian Malcolm's "dime-store philosophizing" and predicted that the film adaptation of the book would be "undoubtedly trashy". He conceded that the book's "only real virtue" was "its genuinely interesting discussions of dinosaurs, DNA research, paleontology and chaos theory".

The novel became even more famous following the release of the 1993 film adaptation, which has grossed more than US$1 billion and spawned several sequels.

In 1996 it was awarded the Secondary BILBY Award.

Adaptation 
In 1993, Steven Spielberg adapted the book into the blockbuster film Jurassic Park. Following the release and critical and commercial success of the first film, Spielberg adapted the book's sequel, The Lost World, into a film in 1997. A third film, directed by Joe Johnston, was released in 2001. The third film, Jurassic Park III, drew several elements, themes, and scenes from both books that were not used in either of the previous films, such as the aviary and boat scenes.

Since the initial adaptation and sequels, there have been several movies added to the film franchise as a continuation of the original Jurassic Park franchise. These include Jurassic World (2015), Jurassic World: Fallen Kingdom (2018), and Jurassic World Dominion (2022). An animated series, Jurassic World Camp Cretaceous, was released in 2020 on Netflix and ran until 2022.

See also 

 John W. Campbell's 1938 story Who Goes There?, about an alien monster in the Arctic thawed out and revived after 20 million years
 The Cursed Earth, a Judge Dredd storyline by Pat Mills in 2000 AD from 1978 that introduces the idea of a dinosaur theme park, with dinosaurs cloned from DNA
 Westworld, Crichton's earlier 1973 film also about a malfunctioning theme park
 Carnosaur, a 1984 novel with similar themes

Notes

References

Further reading

External links
  
Isla Nublar novel map

 
Jurassic Park at the official Michael Crichton website

Jurassic Park novels
1990 American novels
1990 science fiction novels
Techno-thriller novels
Action novels
American biopunk novels
Hard science fiction
Novels about dinosaurs
Living dinosaurs in fiction
Novels set in amusement parks
Novels set on islands
Novels set on fictional islands
Novels set in zoos
Eco-thriller novels
Novels by Michael Crichton
American novels adapted into films
Alfred A. Knopf books
BILBY Award-winning works
Books with cover art by Chip Kidd
Science fiction novels adapted into films
Novels set in Costa Rica
Novels set in Montana
Novels set in Columbia University
Novels set in San Francisco
Novels set in Cupertino, California